Thottippal  is a village in Thrissur district in the state of Kerala, India. It is a part of Parappukkara Grama Panchayat. It houses the famous Thottippal Bhagavathy Temple, one among the 108 Durga Temples in Kerala.

Demographics
 India census, Thottippal had a population of 8241 with 4010 males and 4231 females.

References

Villages in Thrissur district